The 1926 Michigan State Normal Normalites football team was an American football team that represented Michigan State Normal College (later renamed Eastern Michigan University) as an independent during the 1926 college football season.  In their fifth season under head coach Elton Rynearson, the Normalites compiled a 6–1 record, shut out six of their seven opponents, and outscored all opponents by a total of 113 to 12. Harry Ockerman was the team captain.

On October 16, 1926, the Hurons began a 13-game winning streak that continued through the 1927 season. It remains tied for the longest winning streak in program history.

Schedule

References

Michigan State Normal
Eastern Michigan Eagles football seasons
Michigan State Normal Normalites football